Edwin Solany Solano Martínez (born 25 January 1996) is a Honduran professional footballer who plays as a midfielder for Olimpia and the Honduras national team.

Career

In 2018, Solano signed for Honduran top flight side Marathón after playing in the Venezuelan and Honduran second divisions.

References

External links
 
 

Living people
1996 births
Honduran footballers
Honduras international footballers
Association football wingers
Association football midfielders
People from La Ceiba
C.D. Marathón players
2021 CONCACAF Gold Cup players